Saber is an American graffiti artist and muralist.

Career
Saber has painted in the Los Angeles area and in San Francisco, and was interviewed by Juxtapoz Art & Culture Magazine in July 2007.

He is known for a large piece he painted on the concrete bank of the Los Angeles River in 1997. Known not only for its size, Saber's LA River piece was complex and remained at the site for 12 years. In 2004, Saber recreated the piece in a diorama of the river for the Natural History Museum of Los Angeles County exhibit, L.A.: light / motion / dreams. In 2007, the piece was included in the KCET project Departures: LA River.

In 2010 he was one of 20 finalists in a health-care video contest run by Barack Obama’s campaign, painted a mural of an American flag splattered with health-care graffiti and discussed the work with news networks, including Fox News and MSNBC.

In protest of a mural moratorium he hired five skywriters as an art in 2011. Saber told KCET that the project was mostly funded by himself but that other artists, like Shepard Fairey, helped with the undisclosed amount.

References

External links

Living people
1976 births
American graffiti artists
People from Thousand Oaks, California
People from Glendale, California
American muralists